Angela M. Rivers (born 1953 in Champaign, Illinois) is an African-American artist and curator, currently living in Chicago.

Career 
Angela has a BFA in Fine and Applied Arts from the University of Illinois Urbana-Champaign in 1975.

In 1978 she created a mural in Fifth and Park Streets in north Champaign with a group of African-American students and community members.

From 1978 to 1981 she studied Paul Gauguin's work at Eastern Illinois University. She then moved to Chicago to work as an art curator. She worked for the DuSable Museum of African-American History, the Chicago History Museum, and the Art Institute of Chicago.

In 2009 she was  an artist-in-residence at the University of Illinois, where she did a commemoration of the anniversary of the mural in Champaign.

Angela's uncle was visual artist Cecil Dewey Nelson, Jr.

References 

Living people
African-American women artists
University of Illinois College of Fine and Applied Arts alumni
1953 births
People from Champaign, Illinois
American art curators
American women curators
Artists from Chicago
20th-century American artists
21st-century American artists
20th-century American women artists
21st-century American women artists
American muralists
Women muralists
African-American painters
20th-century African-American women
20th-century African-American artists
21st-century African-American women
21st-century African-American artists